Associazione Nuotatori Brescia  (Swimmers Association Brescia) is an Italian sports club based in Brescia, that is interested exclusively in water sports like swimming and water polo.

History 
The club founded in 1973 under the name "AN Brescia" and in 1995 took the name "Leonessa Nuoto Pallanuoto". In 2007 the name changed again becoming "Brixia Leonessa Nuoto". Finally in 2011, following a corporate crisis, summarizes the old name of "AN Brescia".

In the swimming area now experienced its greatest splendor between the eighties and the nineties thanks to the extraordinary victories of Giorgio Lamberti, who won the title  in the 100, 200 and 400m freestyle at the Italian and European championships. To remember the world title in Perth and conquered the world record in Berlin in the 200 with a time of 1 min. 46 sec. and 69, remained unbeaten for ten years.

In the water polo department, the successes of the club have a recent history, came following the entry of the group System as the main sponsor. In 2001, arrives for the first time in its history in LEN Cup final, but was defeated by the Croatian Mladost. A trophy that is put on the bulletin board in later because in five years, between 2002 and 2006, Systema Leonessa manages to win three LEN Cups (beating in the final Pro Recco and Florentia in two derby all Italians and the Russians of Sintez Kazan). Brescia gets its first Italian champions title in 2003, beating Pro Recco. Since 2006 the team, alongside the usual sponsor "Systema", had a new sponsor, "Pompea". Since 2008, the team is called Brixia Leonessa Brescia or Pompea Brixia Leonessa. In 2008 reaches for the second time the championship final, but lost against Pro Recco. In 2009, the team returns to be sponsored by "Systema".

In 2011 for the first time, Brescia reached the Italian Cup final, but lost to the defending champions of the Pro Recco; takes his revenge in 2012, winning the trophy. In the same year it received the third championship final, again versus the "Ligurians", but was defeated.

Honours

Domestic competitions 
Serie A1
 Winners (2): 2002–03, 2020–21
Coppa Italia
 Winners (1): 2011–12

European competitions 
LEN Euro Cup
 Winners (4): 2001-02, 2002–03, 2005–06, 2015–16
 Runners-up (1): 2000-01

Recent seasons

 Cancelled due to the COVID-19 pandemic.

Famous players
  Goran Volarević
 Francesco Di Fulvio
 Aleksandar Ćirić
 Guillermo Molina
 Sava Ranđelović
  Nemanja Ubović
 Maro Joković
 Angelos Vlachopoulos

Famous coaches
  Mirko Blažević

External links 
 Official website
 L'articolo della Gazzetta sulla vittoria dello scudetto

Notes

Water polo clubs in Italy